Exporting Raymond is a 2010 comedy documentary film directed, written, produced and acted by showrunner Philip Rosenthal.

Summary
The documentary follows Rosenthal, the creator of Everybody Loves Raymond, on a journey to create a Russian version of the hit TV series under the name Voroniny.

Cast
 Stanislav Duzhnikov – actor (Lyonya Voronin)
 Anna Frolovtseva – actress (Galina Voronina)
 Boris Klyuyev – actor (Nikolai Voronin)
 Konstantin Naumochkin – executive producer
 Oleg Tabakov – Russian actor
 Georgy Dronov – actor (Kostya Voronin)
 Ray Romano – actor (cameo)
 Eldar – Phil Rosenthal's driver in Russia
 Shablan Muslimov – man with TV set

Reception
On Rotten Tomatoes, it holds a 72% with an average rating of 6.2 out of 10, based on 25 reviews. Metacritic gave a score of 55 out of 100, receiving mixed reviews based on 13 critics.

References

External links
 
 Trailer

2010s Russian-language films
2010 documentary films
2010 films
American documentary films
Russian documentary films
Documentary films about television
2010s English-language films
2010s American films